James Turquand Laidley (1823 – 29 March 1877) was a pastoralist and Member of the Queensland Legislative Council in the colony of Queensland (later a state of Australia).

Early life 
James Turquand Laidley was born in 1823 in Sydney, New South Wales, the son of James Laidley and Eliza Jane (née Shepheard).

Pastoralism 
Laidley acquired Western Creek Station on the Darling Downs in 1848. From 1849 to 1879 he was in partnership with his brother-in-law Henry Mort (married to Laidley's sister Maria) in a pastoral property called Franklyn Vale at Mount Mort, Queensland.

Politics 
Laidley was appointed to the Queensland Legislative Council on the 1 May 1860 and served until his resignation on the 16 August 1864.

Later life 
Laidley died on 29 March 1877 at his home at Ocean Street, Woollahra, Sydney, aged 53 years old. His funeral left his home on Saturday 31 March 1877.

References

Members of the Queensland Legislative Council
1823 births
1877 deaths
19th-century Australian politicians
Pre-Separation Queensland